Statistics of League of Ireland in the 1963/1964 season.

Overview 
It was contested by 12 teams, and Shamrock Rovers won the championship.

Final classification

Results

Top scorers

References 
 rsssf.com

League of Ireland seasons
Ireland
1963–64 in Republic of Ireland association football